Pseudagrion assegaii is a species of damselfly in the family Coenagrionidae. It is found in Botswana, Namibia, South Africa, Uganda, Zambia, and Zimbabwe.

Habitat
Its natural habitats include swamps and pools, especially pools with grass fringes, lilies and some shade. Its continued existence is threatened by habitat loss through agricultural development and groundwater extraction.

References

External links

 Pseudagrion assegaii on African Dragonflies and Damselflies Online

Coenagrionidae
Insects described in 1950
Taxonomy articles created by Polbot